Spain competed at the 2004 Summer Olympics in Athens, Greece, from August 13 to 29, 2004. This nation has competed in every Summer Olympic Games since its official debut in 1920. Spain, however, boycotted two editions, the 1936 Summer Olympics in Nazi Germany, and the 1956 Summer Olympics in Melbourne, as a protest to the Soviet invasion of Hungary. The Spanish Olympic Committee sent the nation's third largest delegation in history to the Games. A total of 317 athletes, 177 men and 140 women, competed in 26 sports.

Medalists

|  style="text-align:left; width:72%; vertical-align:top;"|

|  style="text-align:left; width:23%; vertical-align:top;"|

Archery

Two Spanish archers qualified each for the men's and women's individual archery.

Athletics

Spanish athletes have so far achieved qualifying standards in the following athletics events (up to a maximum of 3 athletes in each event at the 'A' Standard, and 1 at the 'B' Standard).

Men
Track & road events

Field events

Combined events – Decathlon

Women
Track & road events

Field events

Badminton

Basketball

Spain's men basketball team qualified for the event by reaching the final of the EuroBasket 2003.

Men's tournament

Roster

Group play

Quarterfinals

Classification match (7th–8th place)

Women's tournament

Roster

Group play

Quarterfinals

Classification match (5th–6th place)

Canoeing

Slalom

Sprint
Men

Women

Qualification Legend: Q = Qualify to final; q = Qualify to semifinal

Cycling

Road
Men

Women

Track
Sprint

Pursuit

Time trial

Keirin

Omnium

Mountain biking

Diving

Spanish divers qualified for three individual spots at the 2004 Olympic Games.

Men

Women

Equestrian

Dressage

Fencing

Spain qualified one fencer.

Men

Field hockey

Spain qualified a men's and a women's team.  Each team had 16 athletes with two reserves.

Men's tournament

Roster

Group play

Semifinals

Bronze medal match

Women's tournament

Roster

Group play

Gymnastics

Artistic
Men
Team

Individual finals

Women
Team

Individual finals

Rhythmic

Handball

Men's tournament

Roster

Group play

Quarterfinals

Classification match (7th–8th place)

Women's tournament

Roster

Group play

Quarterfinals

Classification semifinals

5th place match

Judo

Ten Spanish judoka qualified for the following events.

Men

Women

Rowing

Spanish rowers qualified the following boats:

Men

Women

Qualification Legend: FA=Final A (medal); FB=Final B (non-medal); FC=Final C (non-medal); FD=Final D (non-medal); FE=Final E (non-medal); FF=Final F (non-medal); SA/B=Semifinals A/B; SC/D=Semifinals C/D; SE/F=Semifinals E/F; R=Repechage

Sailing

Spanish sailors have qualified one boat for each of the following events.

Men

Women

Open

M = Medal race; OCS = On course side of the starting line; DSQ = Disqualified; DNF = Did not finish; DNS= Did not start; RDG = Redress given

Shooting

Four Spanish shooters (two men and two women) qualified to compete in the following events:

Men

Women

Swimming

Spanish swimmers achieved qualifying standards in the following events (up to a maximum of 2 swimmers in each event at the A-standard time, and 1 at the B-standard time):

Men

Women

Synchronized swimming

Nine Spanish synchronized swimmers qualified a spot in the women's team.

Table tennis

Spain has qualified one table tennis player.

Taekwondo

Four Spanish taekwondo jin qualified for the following events:

Tennis

Ten Spanish tennis players (five men and five women) qualified for the following events:

Men

Women

Triathlon

Six Spanish triathletes qualified for the following events.

Volleyball

Beach

Water polo

Men's tournament

Roster

Group play

Quarterfinals

5th place match

Weightlifting

Two Spanish weightlifters qualified for the following events:

Wrestling

Men's Greco-Roman

See also
 Spain at the 2004 Summer Paralympics
 Spain at the 2005 Mediterranean Games

References

External links
Official Report of the XXVIII Olympiad
Spanish Olympic Committee 

Nations at the 2004 Summer Olympics
2004
Olympics